The men's football tournament at the 1990 Asian Games was held from 23 September to 6 October 1990 in Beijing, China.

Squads

Results

Preliminary round

Group A

Group B

Group C

Group D

Knockout round

Quarterfinals

Semifinals

Bronze medal match

Gold medal match

Goalscorers

Final standing

References

RSSSF

External links
Asian Football Results 1990

Men